This list of JVM Languages comprises notable computer programming languages that are used to produce computer software that runs on the Java virtual machine (JVM). Some of these languages are interpreted by a Java program, and some are compiled to Java bytecode and JIT-compiled during execution as regular Java programs to improve performance.

The JVM was initially designed to support only the programming language Java. However, as time passed, even more languages were adapted or designed to run on the Java platform.

JVM languages

High-profile languages 
As of February 2023, according to the TIOBE index of the top 100 programming languages, and PyPL, the top JVM languages are:

 Java (#4, at one point at #1; #2 at PyPL), a statically-typed object-oriented language
 Groovy (#31, at one point at #10; #24 at PyPL), a dynamic programming language (also with static typing) and scripting language
 Kotlin (#33, at one point at #27; #13 at PyPL), a statically-typed language from JetBrains, the developers of IntelliJ IDEA and Google's preferred language for Android
 Scala (#35, at one point at #20; #19 at PyPL), a statically-typed object-oriented and functional programming language
 Clojure (no longer in top 50, is one of 50–100, at one point at #47), a dynamic, and functional dialect of the Lisp programming language (ClojureScript doesn't make TIOBE's index separately, and it's an implementation targeting the web/JavaScript, not the JVM.)

Python is TIOBE's top language; Jython, its JVM implementation, doesn't make the list (of 100 languages) under that name (is syntax compatible with Python 2.7, now an outdated Python version). JavaScript (7th), PHP, R and others, also make top 20 and have JVM implementations; Ruby is ranked 16th, while JRuby, its JVM implementation is listed separately.

JVM implementations of existing languages

New languages with JVM implementations 
 Ateji PX, an extension of Java for easy parallel programming on multicore, GPU, Grid and Cloud 
 Ballerina, a programming language for cloud applications with structural typing; network client objects, services, resource functions, and listeners; parallel concurrency with workers; image building; configuration management; and taint checking.
 BeanShell, a scripting language whose syntax is close to Java
 EPL (Event Processing Language), a domain-specific, data manipulation language for analyzing and detecting patterns in timed event streams, which extends SQL 92 with event-oriented features. It is implemented by Esper: up to version 6 EPL was mostly a language interpreted by a Java library; since version 7 it is compiled to JVM bytecode.
 Concurnas, an open source JVM programming language designed for building reliable, scalable, high performance concurrent, distributed and parallel systems.
 Ceylon, a Java competitor from Red Hat
 CFML, ColdFusion Markup Language, more commonly known as CFML, is a scripting language for web development that runs on the JVM, the .NET framework, and Google App Engine.
 Quark Framework (CAL), a Haskell-inspired functional language
 E-on-Java, object-oriented programming language for secure distributed computing
 Eta, pure, lazy, strongly typed functional programming language in the spirit of Haskell
 Fantom, a language built from the base to be portable across the JVM, .NET Common Language Runtime (CLR), and JavaScript 
 Flix, a functional, imperative, and logic programming language with first-class Datalog constraints and a polymorphic effect system.
 Flow Java
 Fortress, a language designed by Sun as a successor to Fortran, mainly for parallel scientific computing. Product development was taken over by Oracle when Sun was purchased. Oracle then stopped development in 2012 according to Dr. Dobb's. 
 Frege, a non-strict, pure functional programming language in the spirit of Haskell
 Golo, a simple, dynamic, weakly-typed language for the JVM developed at Institut national des sciences appliquées de Lyon, France, now an incubating project at the Eclipse Software Foundation.
 Gosu, an extensible type-system language compiled to Java bytecode
 Haxe, a cross-platform statically typed language that targets Java as well as JVM.
 Ioke, a prototype-based language somewhat reminiscent of Io, with similarities to Ruby, Lisp and Smalltalk
 Jelly
 Join Java, a language that extends Java with join-calculus semantics
 Joy
 Judoscript
 Mirah, a customizable language featuring type inference and a highly Ruby-inspired syntax 
 NetLogo, a multi-agent language
 Noop, a language built with testability as a major focus
 Pizza, a superset of Java with function pointers and algebraic data types
 Pnuts
 Processing, a visualization and animation language and framework based on Java with a Java-like syntax
 Prompto, a language "designed to create business applications in the cloud". It is part of the namesake platform to design business applications directly in the cloud. The Prompto language includes three "dialects": Engly, Monty, and Objy. Engly "mimics English as much as possible", Monty "tries to follow as much as possible the syntax of the Python 3 language", and Objy "tries to follow as much as possible the syntax of OOP languages such as C++, Java or C#". All three dialects seamlessly translate to one another. 
 RascalMPL, a source and target language independent (parameterized) meta programming language
 Whiley
 X10, a language designed by IBM, featuring constrained types and a focus on concurrency and distribution
 Xtend, an object-oriented, functional, and imperative programming language built by the Eclipse foundation, featuring tight Java interoperability, with a focus on extension methods and lambdas, and rich tooling
 Yeti, an ML style functional programming language
 Yirgacheffe, a language that aims to simplify and extend the object oriented paradigm.
 Yoix, general purpose, non-object-oriented, interpreted dynamic programming language

Comparison of these languages

See also 

 Da Vinci Machine
 Java virtual machine#JVM languages
 List of CLI languages, following the CLI specification, Microsoft's response to JVM

Notes

References 

 
JVM